Margaret Anne Feilman  (21 June 1921 – 24 September 2013) was an Australian architect and Perth's first female town planner. She practiced as an architect and landscape designer. A founding member of the Western Australian Town Planning Institute in 1950, she engaged in substantial public speaking as a means of "educating the public as a whole on the need for better planning". Her most notable contribution to town planning was the design and implementation of the Kwinana new town. She also worked for the Commonwealth Government in the 1940s rebuilding Darwin and Guinea following the war.

Early life and career
The daughter of Herbert Bernard and Ethel Anne Feilman (née Turner), Feilman grew up in the Southwest Region of Western Australia. In 1938 she became the first female cadet in the Public Works Department of Western Australia, and completed a Bachelor of Arts degree at the University of Western Australia in 1943. Studying at Perth Technical College, she passed the Final Examination for Registration as an Architect in 1945. She received a British Council scholarship in 1948. In 1950 she completed her Postgraduate Diploma in Town Planning at the School of Town and Country Planning at the University of Durham, after which she returned to Perth and opened a practice in architecture and town planning. In 1952, for the state Public Works Department, she planned the townsite of Kwinana New Town, to house 25,000 industry employees.

A founding member of the Western Australian branch of the National Trust of Australia in 1959, she later became an inaugural Commissioner on the Australian Heritage Commission in 1976, played a role in setting up the Register of the National Estate and supported the introduction of Heritage Conservation Studies in Australian universities. She was also involved in public comment about the various changes in heritage legislation

Feilman died on 24 September 2013.

Notes

References
Bronwyn Hanna, Australia's Early Women Architects: Milestones and Achievements', in Fabrications, Vol.12, No. 1, June 2002. (Subscriber/purchase access only.)
Barry Melotte, 'Landscape, Neighbourhood and Accessibility: The Contribution of Margaret Feilman to Planning and Development in Western Australia', Planning History, Vol.19, No. 2/3, 1997

1921 births
2013 deaths
People from Perth, Western Australia
Australian Officers of the Order of the British Empire
Australian urban planners
Architects from Western Australia
Australian women architects
20th-century Australian architects
20th-century Australian women
21st-century Australian women
21st-century Australian people